Kulseh-ye Sofla (also Romanized as Kūlseh-ye Soflá; also known as Kūlseh-ye Pā'īn) is a village in Bask-e Kuleseh Rural District of the Central District of Sardasht County, West Azerbaijan province, Iran. At the 2006 National Census, its population was 730 in 123 households. The following census in 2011 counted 754 people in 157 households. The latest census in 2016 showed a population of 714 people in 153 households; it was the largest village in its rural district.

References 

Sardasht County

Populated places in West Azerbaijan Province

Populated places in Sardasht County